The Ophiusini are a tribe of moths in the family Erebidae.

Taxonomy
The tribe is one of the most successful of the major radiations of the subfamily Erebinae.  The tribe was previously classified as the subtribe Ophiusina of the subfamily Catocalinae of the family Noctuidae. Phylogenetic studies have shown that the Ophiusini are closely related to the tribe Poaphilini, and both these tribes are best placed in the subfamily Erebinae of the family Erebidae. Many New World genera in the former Ophiusina were split into the tribe Omopterini after phylogenetic studies determined that the New and Old World genera were not as closely related to each other as they are to genera in other tribes of the Erebinae.

Genera
The following genera are included in the tribe.

 Artena
 Buzara
 Cerocala
 Clytie
 Dermaleipa (sometimes in Thyas)
 Dysgonia
 Euphiusa
 Grammodes
 Gnamptonyx
 Heteropalpia
 Lyncestis
 Minucia
 Ophiusa
 Prodotis (may belong in Grammodes)
 Rhabdophera
 Thyas
 Tytroca

References

  (2011): Ophiusini. Version 2.4, 27 January 2011. Retrieved 27 December 2011.

 
Moth tribes